Arizona's 26th Legislative District is one of 30 in the state, situated in Maricopa County. As of 2021, there are 34 precincts in the district, with a total registered voter population of 110,591. The district has an overall population of 240,931.

Political representation
The district is represented for the 2021–2022 Legislative Session in the State Senate by Juan Mendez (D, Tempe) and in the House of Representatives by Melody Hernandez (D, Tempe) and Athena Salman (D, Tempe).

References

Maricopa County, Arizona
Arizona legislative districts